382nd or 382d may refer to:

382d Bombardment Group, inactive United States Air Force unit
382d Bombardment Squadron, unit of the Maine Air National Guard 101st Air Refueling Wing located at Bangor Air National Guard Base, Bangor, Maine
382d Fighter Squadron or 62d Expeditionary Reconnaissance Squadron, provisional United States Air Force unit
382nd Infantry Regiment (United States), infantry regiment in the United States Army

See also
K. 382d, canon for three voices in B-flat major, now thought to be the work of Wenzel Trnka, not Wolfgang Amadeus Mozart
382 (number)
382, the year 382 (CCCLXXXII) of the Julian calendar
382 BC